Agni Shridhar is a Kannada former gangster, writer, critic and artist. He founded Karunada Sene. Later he founded the weekly Kannada newspaper Agni, and turned a professional writer. He has written a book called "Daadagiriya Dinagalu", meaning the days of Goondaism.

He hails from Kanakapura and studied in Bangalore.

Literary works
He has scripted a play called Edegarike.
He has scripted a film  with Girish Karnad called Aa dinagalu which is derived from his Daadagiriya Dinagalu written on Bengaluru crime of 1986.
His directorial debut movie Thamassu
He scripted a film in 2022 called Head bush. Which is directed by shoonya.

Filmography

Awards

Thamassu directed by Agni Shridhar was adjudged as the second best film in the Karnataka State Film Awards for the year 2010-11.
He also won the Best Screen Play writer award for the same movie.

References

Kannada-language writers
Kannada film directors
Indian male screenwriters
Year of birth missing (living people)
Living people
Indian gangsters